Robat (also Romanized as Robāţ; also known as Ribāt and Robāţ-e Shahr-e Bābak) is a village in Khursand Rural District, in the Central District of Shahr-e Babak County, Kerman Province, Iran. At the 2006 census, its population was 571, in 139 families.

References 

Populated places in Shahr-e Babak County